Riffian is a comune (municipality) in South Tyrol in northern Italy, located about  northwest of Bolzano.

Geography

Riffian borders the following municipalities: Kuens, Moos in Passeier, St. Leonhard in Passeier, St. Martin in Passeier, Schenna, and Tirol.

Frazioni
The Riffian municipality contains the frazioni (subdivisions, mainly villages and hamlets) Magdfeld and Vernuer (Vernurio).

History

Coat-of-arms
The emblem represents a bell tower, with the bell box and the onion dome, on azure; it is the symbol of the local church in the village. The emblem was adopted in 1968.

Society

Linguistic distribution
According to the 2011 census, 97.76% of the population speak German, 1.85% Italian and 0.39% Ladin as first language.

Demographic evolution

References

External links
 Homepage of the municipality

Municipalities of South Tyrol